The 1900 Minnesota Golden Gophers football team represented the University of Minnesota in the 1900 Western Conference football season. In their first year under head coach Henry L. Williams, the Golden Gophers compiled a 10–0–2 record (3–0–1 against Western Conference opponents), finished in a tie for first place in the conference, shut out nine of their twelve opponents, and outscored all opponents by a combined total of 299 to 23. The hiring of Dr. Henry L. Williams for the 1900 season marked the first time the program was led by a full-time, salaried coach.

Schedule

References

Minnesota
Minnesota Golden Gophers football seasons
Big Ten Conference football champion seasons
College football undefeated seasons
Minnesota Golden Gophers football